Gaqo Çako (24 January 1935 – 1 August 2018) was an Albanian operatic tenor, awarded with the People's Artist of Albania title. He has been ranked among the best opera singers of Albania, along with Ramiz Kovaçi and Mentor Xhemali.

Career 
Çako was born in 1935 in Korçë, southern Albania, where he spent his early childhood. His family then moved to Kuçovë, and eventually he enrolled in the Jordan Misja Artistic Lyceum in Tirana. Çako studied during 1957–1961 in the Moscow Conservatory under Anna Soloviova. In 1961, after returning to Albania, he started to work at the National Theatre of Opera and Ballet of Albania, where he would become the leading tenor for the three ensuing decades. He also pursued a specialization degree in the 1960s at the Accademia Nazionale di Santa Cecilia, in Rome, Italy. In his career, he performed lead singing roles in Bellini's Norma, Verdi's La traviata and Rigoletto, and Puccini's La bohème, among others. He was well known on Italian stages as well.

Although Çako was an opera tenor, he became popular through 28 participations at the Festivali i Këngës, and won first prizes in the 1967, 1970, and 1978 editions.

Personal life
Çako's wife, Luiza Papa, was a notable opera singer. Their only son, Pirro Çako, is a singer as well. Gaqo Çako was father-in-law of international soprano Inva Mula, daughter of composer Avni Mula, until Pirro and Inva divorced.

References 

1935 births
2018 deaths
People from Korçë
Merited Artists of Albania
Albanian operatic tenors
20th-century Albanian male opera singers
People's Artists of Albania
Accademia Nazionale di Santa Cecilia alumni
Moscow Conservatory alumni
Çako family
21st-century Albanian male opera singers
Festivali i Këngës winners